A demyship (also "demy" for the recipient) is a form of scholarship at Magdalen College, Oxford.

The term is derived from demi-socii or half-fellows, being historically entitled to half the allowance awarded to Fellows. The allowance is now, however, a token award of £200 per year. "Demy" and "demies" are pronounced to rhyme with "deny" and "surmise", rather than "semi(s)". Whilst Magdalen is unique amongst Oxbridge colleges in using the term Demies, Merton College, Oxford is similarly unusual in designating their scholars "postmasters", with a Postmasters Hall.

Foundation

When Magdalen College was founded in 1458 by William of Waynflete, Bishop of Winchester, the Founder ordained that in addition to forty senior scholars, or Fellows, there should be 'thirty poor scholars, commonly called Demies, of good morals and dispositions fully equipped for study'. Recipients are still admitted to the College's Foundation. Whilst the original provision was for 30 scholars, in line with most colleges this number has increased to more than twice that in most years. Richard Mayew, President of the College from 1480 to 1507, added further statutes, resulting in many elections to fellowships and demyships at the College.

Entitlement
Demies are entitled to attend certain ceremonies and dinners. Most notably, all demies and scholars attend the annual Restoration Dinner on 25 October, held annually to commemorate the Restoration of the President and Fellows in 1688. Demies and scholars also receive a token sum of money, usually 10p, at the giving of Claymond's Dole' each year, in a service to commemorate the gift to the College of former President John Claymond (1507–16).

Admission ceremony
The ceremony for admission of new Demies is conducted in the President's lodgings or the College Chapel, immediately before the Restoration Dinner each year. All current Demies observe the ceremony; one by one, each Demy-elect kneels and the President says:

 'Tu dabis fidem te statuta et ordinationes huius Collegii quatenus ad te spectant bene ac fideliter observaturum (observaturam) esse?' 

(Will you faithfully and fully observe the statutes and regulations of this college in so far as they apply to you?)

The Demy-elect then says:

 'Do fidem.' 

(I swear)
            
The President then admits him or her to his or her Demyship with the words:

 'Ego auctoritate Praesidis et sociorum admitto te scholarem in annos insequentes.' 

(By the authority of the President and fellows I admit you as a scholar for the years to come)

The Demy then rises and shakes hands with the President and each current Demy, each of whom greets the new Demy with the traditional Magdalen words 'I wish you joy'.

Notable demies 
 Lord Denning
 Niall Ferguson
 Lewis Gielgud
 Chris Huhne
 T. E. Lawrence
 Peter Medawar
 George Osborne
 Kenneth Tynan
 Oscar Wilde

See also
 Exhibition (scholarship)
 Scholarship — scholar
 Fellows at Oxford and Cambridge

References

External links
 Awards and prizes at Magdalen College, Oxford

Magdalen College, Oxford
Scholarships in the United Kingdom
Terminology of the University of Oxford